Joseph Chatelus (2 December 1908 – 31 March 1979) was a French bobsledder who competed in the early 1950s. At the 1952 Winter Olympics in Oslo, he finished 11th in the four-man event and 17th in the two-man events.

References

1952 bobsleigh two-man results
1952 bobsleigh four-man results
Bobsleigh four-man result: 1948-64
Joseph Chatelus' profile at Sports Reference.com

Bobsledders at the 1952 Winter Olympics
French male bobsledders
1908 births
1979 deaths